Edmund McCarthny (Ed) Cotter (15 January 1927 – 19 October 2017) was a New Zealand mountaineer who made several first ascents on the West Coast of New Zealand and was part of the team that first climbed the Maximilian Ridge on Mount Elie de Beaumont in 1951.

Cotter was a member of the 1951 New Zealand expedition to the Garhwal Himalaya, with Edmund Hillary, George Lowe and Earle Riddiford.

References

External links  

1927 births
2017 deaths
New Zealand mountain climbers
Tour guides
Deaths from dementia in New Zealand
Deaths from Alzheimer's disease
People from Auckland
People educated at Christchurch Boys' High School